Naval Square is a gated community within the Graduate Hospital neighborhood of Philadelphia that served as the first United States Naval Academy from 1834 to 1845, when the Naval Academy formed in Annapolis. It continued as a retirement home for sailors and marines and was called the Naval Home until 1976, when the facility was relocated to Mississippi.

According to the Office of Housing and Community Development, the neighborhood became official, as the three independent parties, the city of Philadelphia (Office of Housing and Community Development), the OHNP (Office of Housing and Neighborhood Preservation), and Toll Brothers worked to bring the historic location to prominence. The Philadelphia Inquirer said that the neighborhood, considered a condo development, succeeded in bucking "the trend with what buyers cited as a combination of location, security, and newness." Prices for houses ranged from $300,000 to $900,000, with 618 units built.

Features
A unique notable feature of Naval Square is that the neighborhood has a "suburban feel" inside the city, unlike other neighborhoods in the city.  According to the source, one resident chose the neighborhood because he wanted a home "near bars, but not in them."

The New York Times states that Naval Square is part of a trend of the city's gentrification, driven by new tax abatement policies. The boundaries of the neighborhood are set by the surrounding brick wall on Grays Ferry Avenue to the east, Bainbridge Street to the north, Schuylkill Avenue to the west, and Christian Street to the south. The Children's Hospital of Philadelphia will be building three new 26-story towers next door to this community in the Schuylkill neighborhood, just outside the gated community, by 2017.

Demographics

The average income of the location, which is also part of the "G-Ho" (Graduate Hospital) neighborhood is around $43,000 to $67,000, and the demographic swing from black to white was described as "dramatic." According to a resident, many black families "moved south to North Carolina or Florida."

History

The location of Naval Square was the home of the Philadelphia Naval Asylum, a precursor to the United States Naval Academy, was completed in 1833 and became the "first retirement home for sailors and marines." By 1838, the midshipmen who were approaching promotion examinations were assigned to the school for eight months of study.

When the Naval Home was relocated to Gulfport, Mississippi, the facility was closed. The historic section of the neighborhood was placed on the National Register of Historic Places and was designated a National Historic Landmark in 1971.

In 2004, Toll Brothers began the first phase of development, with 345 condominiums. In 2009, the firm sold 220 condos and 74 townhomes.

References

Neighborhoods in Philadelphia
Gated communities in Pennsylvania
Southwest Center City, Philadelphia